Rudolf Battěk (2 November 1924 – 17 March 2013) was a Czech sociologist, politician, and political dissident during Czechoslovakia Communist era.

Biography
Battěk co-founded the Club of Committed Non-Party Members (KAN) in 1968, which promoted human rights. KAN was banned by the Soviet Union following the Warsaw Pact invasion of Czechoslovakia later in 1968. Battěk was arrested and imprisoned on two occasions for activities against the Communist regime in Czechoslovakia. He spent ten years imprisoned by Communist authorities during the 1970s and 1980s.

Battěk was a signatory of Charter 77, which criticized the Communist regime for rejecting human rights. He also joined the Committee for the Defence of the Unjustly Prosecuted.

In 1989, Battěk re-entered politics following the Velvet Revolution. He joined the Czech Social Democratic Party (ČSSD), but was expelled from the party in June 1990. Battěk became a member of the Association of Social Democrats after his expulsion from the ČSSD. In 1993, the leadership of the ČSSD reversed its original decision to expel Battěk and invited him to rejoin the ČSSD. Battěk declined the offer to rejoin the ČSSD, choosing to remain a member of the Association of Social Democrats. In 1996, Battěk ran as a candidate for the Senate of the Parliament of the Czech Republic as an independent from ward 8 in Prague, but lost the election.

In 1997, he was awarded the Order of Tomáš Garrigue Masaryk by President of the Czech Republic Václav Havel.

Rudolf Battěk died on 17 March 2013, at the age of 88.

References

1924 births
2013 deaths
Charter 77 signatories
Czech philosophers
Czech sociologists
Czech anti-communists
Czech Social Democratic Party politicians
Czechoslovak prisoners and detainees
People of the Velvet Revolution
Recipients of the Order of Tomáš Garrigue Masaryk
Czechoslovak philosophers